Guy Laporte (11 March 1948 – 11 December 2019) was a French actor.

Biography
Laporte performed the majority of his acts at Le Splendid, a café-théâtre in Paris. Most notably, he played a village chief in French Fried Vacation. He collaborated multiple times with Marc Jolivet.

Guy Laporte died on 11 December 2019 from Charcot–Marie–Tooth disease, which he had been fighting for two years.

Filmography
French Fried Vacation (1978)
French Fried Vacation 2 (1979)
Pierrot mon ami (1979)
Alors... Heureux ? (1980)
Viens chez moi, j'habite chez une copine (1980)
 Les Charlots contre Dracula (1980)
Ma femme s'appelle reviens (1982)
Le Voyageur imprudent (1982)
Circulez y'a rien à voir (1983)
Pinot simple flic (1984)
Marche à l'ombre (1984)
Subway (1984)
Moi vouloir toi (1985)
Nuit d'ivresse (1986)
Le Beauf (1986)
Une époque formidable… (1991)
A Mere Mortal (1991)
Dead Tired (1994)
Un homme digne de confiance (1997)
Concours de danse à Piriac (2006)

References

1948 births
2019 deaths
20th-century French male actors
21st-century French male actors
Place of death missing
Neurological disease deaths in France
People from Angers